Winston Place is a historic residence in Valley Head, Alabama.  William O. Winston, a lawyer from Rogersville, Tennessee, moved to DeKalb County in 1838.  Winston would later serve in the Alabama House of Representatives and was a major investor in the Wills Valley Railroad, which would later connect Chattanooga with Birmingham.  Soon after arriving in Alabama, Winston built a two-story I-house.  In the late 19th century, the exterior was extensively modified with a two-story, wrap-around, Colonial Revival porch and tetrastyle portico.  Around 1930, rear outbuildings were connected to the house, giving it an L-shaped plan.  The house was listed on the Alabama Register of Landmarks and Heritage in 1976 and the National Register of Historic Places in 1987. Dr. Jacob Brown is the current owner from 2022-present.

References

National Register of Historic Places in DeKalb County, Alabama
Houses on the National Register of Historic Places in Alabama
Colonial Revival architecture in Alabama
Houses completed in 1838
Houses in DeKalb County, Alabama
Properties on the Alabama Register of Landmarks and Heritage